The monstrance clock, or mirror clock, is a type of clock that was developed during the Renaissance (1300 AD – 1600 AD). It is cross-shaped and typically either gold or silver in colour but can feature both colours. They used to play an important part in a church ritual and often incorporated sacred figures as part of the design. The clock made use of a rotating ball at the top or in the base to indicate the time of day. Monstrance clocks and crucifix clocks remained fashionable until the eighteenth century.

Pop culture references include the song "Monstrance Clock" by the band Ghost. The song itself has themes of satanic ritual, rather than Renaissance-age Catholicism.

References 

Clock designs